Polyvios "Paul" Chatzopoulos (born 17 July 1961) is a Greek former professional footballer who played as a center back.

Club career
Chatzopoulos started football with the team of Panarkadikos at the age of 15 and later transferred to Panionios, where he played for 5 years having a good presence. He initially started his career as a striker, but later established himself mainly as a center back, occasionally playing as a defensive midfielder. He was transferred to AEK in the summer of 1985 and remained in the team until December 1988. He played as a sweeper, with Stelios Manolas as a stopper and distinguished himself mainly for his composure in his game and his quite good technique for a defensive footballer. He left the club in December 1988, after not being trusted by Dušan Bajević and making just 3 league appearances in the first half of that season. In 1989 he competed in Diagoras and followed a two-year spell in Xanthi He continued in smaller categories, returning for two years to Panarkadikos and ended his career in 1995 competing for one year in Sparta.

International career
Chatzopoulos was a played Greece U21 of the early 80s. In 1983 he competed with the national team in the Mediterranean Games. He participated in three matches and scored in the victory against Libya, in the 81st minute. Also, in 1983 he competed in the Olympic team.

He played Greece. His first participation was on 11 April 1984 in a home friendly 1–1 draw against Cyprus. His second and final appearance was on 17 October 1984 in a world cup away match against Poland.

After football
After the end of his career, Chatzopoulos worked as a scout for Asteras Tripolis, while today he is the regional coach-coordinator of Peloponnese at the HFF for the national team in the U15.

References

1961 births
Living people
Greek footballers
Panionios F.C. players
AEK Athens F.C. players
Diagoras F.C. players
Xanthi F.C. players
Association football defenders
Greece international footballers
Footballers from Tripoli, Greece